Dan Ahearn (né Daniel William Ahearne; April 12, 1888 – December 20, 1942) was an Irish and later American track and field athlete and a member of the Irish American Athletic Club. He competed for the U.S. Olympic team in the 1920 Summer Olympics.

He was born in Athea, Ireland and was the younger brother of Tim Ahearne. Ahearn immigrated with his family to the United States in 1909 where the "e" from Ahearne was dropped. He was not naturalized before 1912 because he was not allowed to compete in the 1912 Summer Olympics when he did not hold the U.S. citizenship.

He won the National Amateur Athletic Union junior broad jump championship in 1908. In 1909 Ahearn established several new records for the hop, skip, and jump, but the Amateur Athletic Union threw them out on technicalities. In July 1909, Ahearn succeeded in getting his name on the record books by creating a new record for the two hops and jump, doing the distance of 50 feet 2 inches.

In 1910, at the games of the "First Regiment Irish Volunteers held at Celtic Park, Long Island City...Dan Ahearn, the jumper of the Winged Fist Club, lowered the world's record (in the triple jump) of 50 feet 1/2 inch, held by D. Shanahan, the Irish Jumper."

In 1920 he finished sixth in the Olympic triple jump competition. He was later a policeman in Chicago and died there aged 54.

Notes

References
 
 
 Athlétisme L'Equipe Magazine n°14 January 1970 in France.

External links
 
 
 Irish America Archives - NYU
 Winged Fist Organization

1888 births
1949 deaths
Irish male triple jumpers
American male triple jumpers
Olympic track and field athletes of the United States
Athletes (track and field) at the 1920 Summer Olympics
World record setters in athletics (track and field)
Sportspeople from County Limerick
Irish male long jumpers
American male long jumpers
Irish emigrants to the United States (before 1923)